Guillarmodia is a genus of predatory air-breathing land snails, terrestrial pulmonate gastropod mollusks in the family Spiraxidae.

Distribution 
The distribution of the genus Guillarmodia includes Mexico and Costa Rica.

Species 
Species in the genus Guillarmodia include:

Subgenus Guillarmodia H. B. Baker, 1941 include 14 species:
 Guillarmodia arthritica (Thompson, 1995)
 Guillarmodia brachystyla (Thompson, 1995)
 Guillarmodia comma (Thompson, 1995)
 Guillarmodia cymatophora (Pilsbry, 1910)
 Guillarmodia dorsalis (Thompson, 1963)
 Guillarmodia elegans (Von Martens, 1895)
 Guillarmodia gracilior (Thompson, 1995)
 Guillarmodia kingi (Thompson, 1995)
 Guillarmodia mariana (Dall, 1926)
 Guillarmodia minuta (Pilsbry, 1910)
 Guillarmodia multispira (Pfeiffer, 1861)
 Guillarmodia nelsoni (Bartsch, 1909)
 Guillarmodia pupa (H. B. Baker, 1941) - type species
 Guillarmodia pygmaea (Pilsbry & Vanatta, 1936)
 Guillarmodia stenotrema (Thompson, 1995)

Subgenus Proameria H. B. Baker, 1941 includes 27 species:
 Guillarmodia albersi (Pfeiffer, 1854)
 Guillarmodia alticola (Pilsbry, 1903)
 Guillarmodia attenuata (Pfeiffer, 1851)
 Guillarmodia bellula (Crosse & Fischer, 1869)
 Guillarmodia chasonae Pilsbry & Cockerell, 1926
 Guillarmodia conferta (Pfeiffer, 1861)
 Guillarmodia cordovana (Pfeiffer, 1856)
 Guillarmodia dalli (Pilsbry, 1899)
 Guillarmodia delicata Pilsbry, 1903
 Guillarmodia delicatula (Shuttleworth, 1852)
 Guillarmodia filosa (Pfeiffer, 1855)
 Guillarmodia fischeri (Von Martens, 1891)
 Guillarmodia mitriformis (Angas, 1879)
 Guillarmodia oblonga (Pfeiffer, 1866)
 Guillarmodia orizabae (Pfeiffer, 1856)
 Guillarmodia polita (Strebel, 1975)
 Guillarmodia potosiana Pilsbry, 1908
 Guillarmodia pulcherrima (Strebel, 1883)
 Guillarmodia rhoadsi (Pilsbry, 1899)
 Guillarmodia saxitilis H. B. Baker, 1941
 Guillarmodia sayula (Von Martens, 1891)
 Guillarmodia speciosa (Pfeiffer, 1856)
 Guillarmodia sulcifera (Von Martens, 1891)
 Guillarmodia tepicensis Pilsbry & Cockerell, 1926
 Guillarmodia tortillana (Pfeiffer, 1846)
 Guillarmodia turgida (Pfeiffer, 1861)
 Guillarmodia victoriana (Pilsbry, 1903)

References 

Spiraxidae